Alfredo Bini (12 December 1926 – 16 October 2010) was an Italian film producer. He produced 32 films between 1958 and 1979. He was born in Livorno, Italy.

Selected filmography
 The Law Is the Law (1958)
 Il bell'Antonio (1960)
 La Viaccia (1961)
 Accattone (1961)
 Mamma Roma (1962)
 Ro.Go.Pa.G. (1963)
 The Gospel According to St. Matthew (1964)
 El Greco (1966)
 The Hawks and the Sparrows (1966)
 Oedipus Rex (1967)
 Satyricon (1969)

References
Corriere (Italian) retrieved 18th Oct 2010

External links

1926 births
2010 deaths
Italian film producers
Nastro d'Argento winners